Robert David Gamble (born 9 March 1937 in Philadelphia, died on 17 November 2020 in Poznań) - an American businessman and Episcopal priest, a great-grandson of James Gamble (an Irishman of Scottish descent). Between 1980 and 1992, he was a hospital chaplain in Boston. In 1984, he started being engaged in the movement of Alcoholics Anonymous in Poland. In 1991 or 1992, he co-founded Radio Obywatelskie (Civic Radio, on Polish Wikipedia). In 1992, he co-founded Media Rodzina (a publishing house in Poznań). In 1999, he received the Order of Merit of the Republic of Poland. Between 2005 and 2014, he was the pastor of the Anglican Church in Poland (on Polish Wikipedia). In 2014, he received a title of a titular pastor of this parish from the Bishop in Europe. He used to organize a Christmas Eve for the solitary people in Poznań. In 2016, he received the Title of Merit of the City of Poznań (on Polish Wikipedia). He published a Polish version of Harry Potter and the Philosopher's Stone, an autobiography of Barack Obama, and Promise Me, Dad (a 2017 memoir by former Vice President of the United States Joe Biden). Both in the case of Barack Obama and Joe Biden, he published their books before they became a President of the United States.

References

20th-century American Episcopal priests
21st-century Anglican priests
American expatriates in Poland
American publishers (people)
Recipients of the Order of Merit of the Republic of Poland
1937 births
2020 deaths
21st-century American clergy